Kerr's Pink is a potato cultivar in wide production in Ireland and the United Kingdom and many other countries. Although often quoted as an "Irish potato" (where it was introduced in 1917), the cultivar was actually created by J. Henry of Cornhill, Scotland, in 1907.

In 2002, it accounted for 25% of potato production in Ireland, making it the nation's second largest variety.

'Kerr's Pink' potatoes have a distinctive pink colour with deep eyes. They are quite floury and starchy. They are very good for mashing and boiling but can also be chipped.

'Kerr's Pink's grow with many tubers and can catch potato blight very easily. They have a slightly low resistance to common scab and tend to have a low resistance to potato cyst nematode (pallida) and potato cyst nematode (rostochiensis). The variety has an average resistance to powdery scab and blackleg. It has a very high resistance to slugs and a relatively high resistance to splitting.

References

External links
Kerr's Pink Potato History
Kerr's Pink Potato Characteristics
British Potato Council Kerr's Pink

Potato cultivars